Voices from Chernobyl is a 2016 Luxembourgian documentary film directed by Pol Cruchten, based on the 1997 oral history book by Nobel Prize winner Svetlana Alexievitch. It was selected as the Luxembourgian entry for the Best Foreign Language Film at the 89th Academy Awards but it was not nominated.

See also
 List of submissions to the 89th Academy Awards for Best Foreign Language Film
 List of Luxembourgish submissions for the Academy Award for Best Foreign Language Film

References

External links
 

2016 films
2016 documentary films
Luxembourgian documentary films
2010s French-language films
Films directed by Pol Cruchten
Documentary films about the Chernobyl disaster